Malakia Gurieli, of the Georgian House of Gurieli, was Prince of Guria from 1684 to 1685 and again in 1689. A younger son of Kaikhosro I Gurieli, he succeeded on the death of his brother Giorgi III Gurieli in 1684, only to be overthrown and blinded by his nephew Kaikhosro II Gurieli. Briefly restored through the Ottoman intervention in 1689, he was deposed by Guria's nobility for incompetence. Malakia entered the priesthood and became Bishop of Shemokmedi.

Biography 
Malakia Gurieli was a younger son of Kaikhoshro I Gurieli, Prince of Guria, by his wife Khvaramze Goshadze. On the murder of Kaikhosro by the nobleman Machutadze in 1660, Malakia and his elder brother Giorgi fled to the protection of the Ottoman pasha of Akhaltsikhe, whose help Giorgi eventually exploiting in securing the princely throne of Guria after the death of Demetre Gurieli in 1668. In 1684, Giorgi was killed at the battle of Rokiti against King Alexander IV of Imereti and Malakia was placed as his successor by the victorious king. Next year, Giorgi's son Kaikhosro returned from his exile in Akhaltsikhe with troops provided by Yusuf Pasha of Akhaltsikhe; Malakia was dethroned and, in his turn, retired to Akhaltsikhe. The pasha attempted the reconciliation between the two Gurieli, but Kaikhosro reneged on his promise not to harm Malakia and had his uncle captured and blinded. This offended the pasha, who had the bey of Şavşat assassinated Kaikhosro in 1689. Malakia was restored as Prince of Guria, but his rule did not last long. The Gurians, who regarded Malakia incompetent, bribed the pasha of Akhaltsikhe and secured his support in deposing Malakia in favor of his another nephew, Mamia III Gurieli. Malakia took the monastic vows and was made by Mamia Gurieli bishop of Shemokmedi, a position he occupied until 1703, when he was replaced with the archbishop Ioane.

References 

17th-century people from Georgia (country)
House of Gurieli
Blind royalty and nobility
18th-century people from Georgia (country)